Shamardal (27 March 2002 – 16 April 2020) was a Thoroughbred racehorse who competed in the United Kingdom and in France and was voted the 2004 European Champion Two-Year-Old.

Background
Bred at Watercress Farm in Paris, Kentucky, Shamardal was sired by the 2000 European Horse of the Year, Giant's Causeway. He was out of the mare Helsinki, who had been only an average runner, but who was a full sister to Street Cry. Shamardal's damsire was Machiavellian, a son of the leading sire in North America, Mr. Prospector.

In November 2002, his breeders put him up for sale at the Keeneland Sales but when the bidding failed to meet their reserve price they decided to wait until the following year to auction him again. In early 2003, the yearling began to exhibit a subtle lack of coordination and an abnormal clumsiness in his gaits. He was soon diagnosed with a Grade 3 level of cervical vertebral malformation syndrome, a spinal disorder commonly referred to by horsemen as the "wobbles". The disease means the horse will likely never race and usually results in their having to be euthanized because their condition can cause them to collapse without warning that could result in severe injury to a handler. Shipped to specialists at Ohio State University, x-rays and a myelogram confirmed the condition. As such, his breeder/owners filed an insurance claim and turned ownership over to the insurance company where the colt became a standard case for euthanasia.

Richard Ketch, a former show horse trainer and farrier, became involved with the case as an adjuster for the insurers. As someone very familiar with the disease, he believed that there were alternative treatments that might save the colt's life. On Ketch's initiative, an agreement was reached with the insurance company to turn the colt over to him and his associate Herwig Schoen, a self-proclaimed "energy healer". Some call their treatment program "voodoo medicine", pointing out that research has shown that in about ten percent of these cases within twelve to fifteen months a horse will recover on its own. Nonetheless, under Ketch and his associates the colt made a full recovery.

Certified sound by multiple professionals, Ketch sent him to the October 2003 Tattersalls Houghton Yearling Sale at Newmarket in England where Sheikh Mohammed's Gainsborough Stud acquired the colt they would name Shamardal. However, the string of bad luck continued as he was sold for the very small price of 50,000 guineas after an endoscopic test of his breathing passages had erroneously diagnosed him as having breathing problems.

Racing career

2004: two-year-old season
Because the Maktoum family has such large worldwide racing stables, they sometimes follow the industry practice of leasing out some of their horses. Shamardal was one. Leased to businessman Abdulla Buhaleeba, the colt was prepared for racing by trainer Mark Johnston.

Shamardal first raced in 2004 at age two, winning a six-furlong maiden at Scotland's Ayr Racecourse in which he ran away from the field and won by eight lengths. He then was entered in the 28 July Group Two Vintage Stakes at Goodwood Racecourse in Chichester, England. He won that seven-furlong race by  lengths and in the process defeated Wilko, who went on to win that autumn's Breeders' Cup Juvenile in the United States. Following the race, the lease arrangement between Gainsborough Stud and Abdulla Buhaleeba was terminated for reasons that have never been made public.

Racing under the Gainsborough Stud banner, Shamardal ran into training problems that kept him out of racing until the 16 October Dewhurst Stakes at Newmarket Racecourse. In what is considered England's most important race for two-year-olds, Shamardal easily won the Group One event by  lengths. Undefeated after three races, he was voted the 2004 European Champion Two-Year-Old.

2005: three-year-old season
Competing at age three under the Maktoum family's Godolphin Racing banner, Shamardal was conditioned by their head trainer, Saeed bin Suroor. The colt made his 2005 debut in the UAE Derby at Nad Al Sheba Racecourse in Dubai but performed poorly in his first race on dirt. Sent to France, where he was back on grass, under jockey Frankie Dettori he turned back several challenges in the straight while winning the Group One Poule d'Essai des Poulains at Longchamp Racecourse. He then captured the important Prix du Jockey Club, a Group One race he won by a head over Hurricane Run, who ran erratically in his run to the finish line.

Returned to England for his next start at York Racecourse in June's St. James's Palace Stakes, Shamardal won his third Group One race of 2005 and the fourth of his career. While in training for his next scheduled start in the Eclipse Stakes, he  fractured a front fetlock joint and was retired having never lost on the turf.

Stud career
He stood at stud at Sheikh Mohammed's Kildangan Stud near Kildangan, Ireland. As a stallion, he is the sire of Mukhadram, Dan Excel, Able Friend, Lumiere, Lope de Vega, Pinatubo and Tarnawa.

Shamardal was euthanized at Kildangan Stud on 16 April 2020 following health issues.

Major winners
c = colt, f = filly, g = gelding

References

External links
 YouTube video of Shamardal's win in the French 2000 Guineas
YouTube video of Shamardal's win in the French Derby

2002 racehorse births
2020 racehorse deaths
Racehorses bred in Kentucky
Racehorses trained in the United Kingdom
French Thoroughbred Classic Race winners
Cartier Award winners
Racehorses trained in the United Arab Emirates
Thoroughbred family 1-l